The Rotax Type 256 is a  two-stroke parallel twin-cylinder racing engine, designed, developed and produced by Rotax, between 1980 and 1998. It was primary used in kart (especially kart racing) applications, as well as motorcycle racing applications, such as competing in the 250cc class of the Grand Prix motorcycle World Championship.

References 

Rotax engines